Rhynchorthoceras is a Middle Ordovician genus characterized by a rapidly expanded, weakly annulate orthocone, like the orthoconic section of Ancistroceras, but with only a curved, cyrtoconic apex instead of juvenile whorls.

Rhynchorthoceras is probably derived from Ancistroceras by a loss of the tarphycerid type apex, although it has been included with the orthocerid Sinoceratidae.

References
Flower, R. H. 1950.  A Classification of the Nautiloidia. Jour Paleontology, V.24, N.5, pp 604–616, Sept.
Furnish & Glenister, 1964. Nautiloidea -Tarphycerida. Treatise on Invertebrate Paleontology Part K, Mollusca 3 ...Nautiloidea

Nautiloids
Paleozoic life of Newfoundland and Labrador